Brassica cretica is a species of flowering plant in the family Brassicaceae, native to the Eastern Mediterranean, particularly to Greece and the Aegean Islands. It was first described by Jean-Baptiste Lamarck in 1785. A 2021 study suggested that it was the origin of cultivated Brassica oleracea, with later admixture from other Brassica species.

Subspecies
, Plants of the World Online recognized three subspecies:
Brassica cretica subsp. aegaea (Heldr. & Halácsy) Snogerup, M.A.Gust. & Bothmer
Brassica cretica subsp. cretica
Brassica cretica subsp. laconica M.A.Gust. & Snogerup
Other sources have recognized only two subspecies, subsp. cretica and subsp. nivea . Some populations identified as B. cretica appear to be escapes from cultivation.

References

cretica
Flora of Albania
Flora of the East Aegean Islands
Flora of Greece
Flora of Crete
Flora of Lebanon and Syria
Flora of Palestine (region)
Flora of Turkey
Plants described in 1785